The Bijon Setu massacre was the killing and burning of 16 Hindu sadhus and a sadhvi belonging to Ananda Marga, at Bijon Setu, near Ballygunge, Kolkata, in West Bengal, India, on 30 April 1982. Although the attacks were carried out in broad daylight, no arrests were ever made. After repeated calls for a formal judicial investigation, a single-member judicial commission was set up to investigate the killings in 2012.

Killings
On the morning of 30 April 1982, 17 Ananda Marga renunciates (16 monks and one nun) were dragged out of taxis that were taking them to an educational conference at the organization's headquarters in Tiljala, Kolkata. They were beaten to death and then set on fire simultaneously at three different locations. It was reported that the killings took place in broad daylight and were witnessed by thousands of people.

Initial press reports and reactions
The Statesman Weekly, a leading Calcutta newspaper at the time, reported a week after the incident that "Seventeen Ananda Margis, two of them women, were killed on April 30 morning by frenzied mobs at three places in South Calcutta on the suspicion that they were child-lifters." The reporting did not include any compassion for the victims or their families, a tone that prefigured the reaction of both government and the media. Similar unsympathetic reporting appeared in the 5 May edition of the Statesman as well as contemporaneous editions of Sunday and India Today. The Minister of State for Home Affairs was quoted to the effect that the police reaction could have been improved but then went on to reassure members of Parliament that "the Government was watching the activities of the Marg [Ananda Marga members]". In his study on the incident, historian Narasingha Sil concluded the government's overall attitude was that the Ananda Marga members had "got themselves killed because they were so sinfully invidious". The wire story sent out by United Press International added the detail that two of the nuns who were killed were "seen carrying a child near a railway station".

Explanations

As part of its initial coverage, The Statesman Weekly reported the state's Chief Minister's suspicions that the attack had been staged to embarrass the party in power prior to the upcoming election. Ananda Marga blamed the attack on the Communist Party of India (Marxist). While this accusation was repeated for many years,
recent Ananda Marga scholarship now assumes the mob was motivated by unfounded allegations of child kidnapping.

Narasingha Sil discusses at length the state of the reputation of Ananda Marga in the years and months leading up to the massacre. Sil describes how members of Ananda Marga had engaged in many acts of violence (including murders of members leaving the group); media coverage and government response made the group out to be far more violent than it actually was. Sil then described how the term "child-lifter," (chheledhora) is a particularly loathsome label in Bengal and drew a parallel to how women accused of witchcraft were treated in the West. Sil reported how three people were beaten to death by a mob after being suspected of child kidnapping even though no report of any such kidnappings were ever made to the police.

Historian Helen Crovetto further develops this line of thought, noting that the social services provided by the Ananda Marga may have made them more vulnerable to such an accusation.

Investigations and memorials

Jyoti Basu was the Chief Minister of the Left Front Government in Bengal when this incident took place. At that time, Jyoti Basu's police was accused of inaction. Faced with pressure, Mr. Basu formed the Deb Commission. But Ananda Margis had no faith in that Commission because,  Kanti Ganguly and other prominent CPM leaders were accused in this incident. The National Human Rights Commission took up the investigation of the case in 1996 but did not make much headway, allegedly due to interference from the state government at the time. On 30 April 1999, the Ananda Marga Pracharaka Samgha (AMPS) demanded a high-level judicial probe, led by a working Supreme Court judge, into the mass killing of Ananda Margis. On 30 April 2004, Ananda Marga was able to hold the first rally in Calcutta commemorating the massacre without the necessity of first acquiring a court order forcing the police to allow the rally to occur. The group till date continues to block the bridge and nearby areas on 30 April every year holding a procession. They observe this day as 'Save Humanity Day'. After the Trinamool Congress came to power, Amitabh Lala Commission of Inquiry, a single-member judicial commission under the supervision of Amitabh Lala, a former judge of the Calcutta High Court was empaneled in March 2012 to investigate the killings, after repeated appeals for a formal judicial inquiry. The Commission appointed by the West Bengal Government has already completed its investigation. It is also heard that the report has been submitted.

According to Commission sources, some documents allege that important CPI(M) leaders of the Kasba-Jadavpur area met at Colony Bazar in Picnic Garden on February 6, 1982, to discuss the Ananda Margis, whose headquarters was then coming up at what was at the time a difficult-to-access location in Tiljala. The meeting was reportedly attended by former Left Front cabinet minister Kanti Ganguly; Sachin Sen, the late former CPI(M) MLA; Nirmal Haldar, local CPI(M) leader; Amal Majumdar, former councillor of ward no. 108 (Tiljala-Kasba); and Somnath Chatterjee, the then Member of Parliament from Jadavpur and subsequently Speaker of Lok Sabha. Ananda Margis faced the wrath of the Communists because they opposed them ideologically, and the CPM in the early 80s was deeply skeptical of their activities. The first attack on the Margis took place in 1967 at their Purulia Global Headquarters where five of them were allegedly killed by the CPI(M) cadres. Just two years later, the Cooch Behar congregation of the Ananda Marga was attacked. The CPM had always believed that political ambitions and agenda lay underneath the spiritual-religious cover of the Marga. Even after the 1982 Bijon Setu Massacre, in April 1990, five members of the Ananda Marga were allegedly murdered by CPI(M) cadres in Purulia. Regarding the heinous massacre of 1982, the then Chief Minister Jyoti Basu infamously said, "What can be done? Such things do happen."

Explanatory notes

References

Further reading
 A documentary about the 30 April 1982 massacre 
 30 April 1982, A Pathetic Chapter of History Written in Blood of the 17 Monks and Nuns of Ananda Marga ananda-marga.org (link from the official website of Ananda Marga)
 Photos of Ananda Margi processions in Calcutta marking the anniversary of the massacre

20th-century mass murder in India 
1982 murders in India
April 1982 events in Asia
Crime in Kolkata
1980s in Kolkata
Massacres of Bengali Hindus in India 
Lynching deaths in India
Massacres in 1982
Massacres in West Bengal
Massacres of Bengalis
Mass murder in 1982 
Violence against Hindus in India 
People murdered in West Bengal
Deaths from fire
Deaths by beating
People executed by burning